Philip Grant Anderson  (born 20 March 1958) is a British-born Australian former professional racing cyclist who was the first non-European to wear the yellow jersey of the Tour de France.

Origins
Phil Anderson was born in London but moved to Melbourne, Australia, when he was young. He grew up in the suburb of Kew and graduated from Trinity Grammar School in 1975. He first raced with Hawthorn Cycling Club, where Allan Peiper, another future professional, was also a member. Peiper said: "Phil went to a private school and joined the club with his mate, Peter Darbyshire. My best friend was Tom Sawyer, later a six-day racer in Europe, and we were the two rough nuts, while Phil and Darbs were the two upper-class boys".

Amateur career
Anderson won the 1977 Dulux Tour of the North Island in New Zealand and the Australian team time-trial championship at Brisbane in 1978. In that year he also won the Commonwealth Games road race in Edmonton, Alberta, Canada. He was 19.

He moved to France in 1979 to join the ACBB, a club at Boulogne-Billancourt in the suburbs of Paris with a reputation of placing riders in professional teams, particularly Peugeot. Whilst he was with the ACBB he lived and raced alongside Robert Millar and Mark Bell. That season he won the Tour de l'Essonne, the Tour de l'Hérault and the amateur version of the unofficial world time-trial championship, the Grand Prix des Nations, in Cannes.

Professional career

Anderson turned professional in 1980, for Peugeot, one of the oldest French teams. He won two races in his first season – the Prix de Wetteren and a stage in the Étoile des Espoirs, and came second in two others. He moved to Lokeren, Belgium, to ride criteriums.

It was a big change; I'd never lived out of home before, so that was a big difference, and then there's the length of the races; you know all of a sudden you're riding 200 km a day instead of back here you'd be racing 80 or 100 km a day; huge fields, you turn up at a race and you'd have 200 riders, 250 riders. It's difficult because I was on a French team, and I felt that the French riders got priority, and I had to go a bit deeper or had to be a little better than some of my colleagues on the team. But that hardened me, and put pressure on me, and I think became part of my make-up in the end.

He came fifth in the 1982 Tour de France, in which he held the white jersey of best young rider, and again fifth in 1985, the year he won the Tour de Suisse. That same season he finished second in the Super Prestige Pernod International, forerunner of the UCI points championship. His highlights were wearing the yellow jersey of the 1981 Tour de France and then again for nine days of 1982. He was the first rider from outside Europe to lead the race. Anderson described what it meant in 1981:

It happened in the Pyrenees. This was my first Tour de France. I didn't have aspirations of becoming the wearer of the yellow jersey or anything like that. I was given my instructions and I was supposed to look after a rider on my team, the team leader, a Frenchman, and I forgot my instructions and just sort of went into survival mode over a number of mountain passes, just staying up with some of the top riders, and before I knew it, my team director came up beside me in his car and told me, 'Listen, what happened to your leader, the guy that you've been instructed to watch today?' you know. And to help if he has any troubles, or just pace him back if he's having some troubles. And I said, 'Oh gee, that's right. Where is he?' And he said, 'he's five or ten minutes back, in the next group.' I said, 'No worries I'll wait up for him.' He said, 'No, no, stay up here, you're doing OK, just stay out of trouble and try and hang on as long as possible.'

So hang on I did, and whistled down the next mountain and got to the last climb and I stayed up with Bernard Hinault; there was one rider, a Belgian rider, Lucien Van Impe rode away, an excellent climber, he rode away and so we came in a couple of minutes later, but I had enough time from some good days previously, that I climbed into the yellow jersey, and I had no idea of what the sort of yellow jersey represented, because I mean there's so much history to it, and for me it was just like, 'Oh yes, great, I don't have to wash my old jersey tonight, you know, get a new one'. But really, you're sort of at the highest level of the sport.

His best year was 1985, when he won the Tour Méditerranéen, Critérium du Dauphiné Libéré and the Tour de Suisse, as well as finishing second in the Tour of Flanders and Gent–Wevelgem. He continued to ride the Tour until 1989, when he came 38th, but by then he had arthritis. In 1990 he joined the American team,  – "Speculation has it that he took a big pay cut; maybe that is what turned into motivation which resulted in his comeback to the big league", said Peiper – and he won the Tour Méditerranéen and the Tour of Sicily and stages of the Tour de Suisse and Tour de France. He also won the Tour of Britain in 1991 and 1993.

Retirement and honours
Anderson retired to a farm he bought in Jamieson and has what he calls the life of a gentleman farmer. He was given the Medal of the Order of Australia in 1987 for service to cycling. In 2000, he received the Australian Sports Medal and in 2001 he received a Centenary Medal for service to society through cycling. He was inducted into the Sport Australia Hall of Fame in 2010. In 2015, he was an inaugural Cycling Australia Hall of Fame inductee.

Private life
Anderson has married twice, first to Anne, whom he married just after turning professional, and then Christi Valentine, who in 1999 wrote Anderson's biography, Phil Anderson: Cycling Legend. Anderson and Valentine married on 29 April 1994 and separated in 2005. Anderson has been in a relationship with Anne Newell since 2006.

Career achievements

Major results

1978
 1st  Road race, Commonwealth Games
1980
 3rd Overall Paris–Bourges
1981
 1st Stage 6 Paris–Nice
 10th Overall Tour de France
Held  after Stage 6
1982
 5th Overall Tour de France
1st  Young rider classification
1st Stage 2
Held  after Stages 2–11
 7th Overall Critérium du Dauphiné Libéré
1983
 1st Amstel Gold Race
 2nd Overall Tour de Romandie
1st Stage 5a
 3rd Overall Paris–Bourges
 3rd Liège–Bastogne–Liège
 6th Overall Critérium du Dauphiné Libéré
1st Prologue & Stage 3
 7th Super Prestige Pernod International
 9th Overall Tour de France
1984
 1st  Overall Setmana Catalana de Ciclisme
1st Stage 4b
 1st Züri-Metzgete
 1st Rund um den Henninger Turm Frankfurt
 2nd Liège–Bastogne–Liège
 3rd Super Prestige Pernod International
 7th Overall Critérium du Dauphiné Libéré
1st Stage 6
 9th La Flèche Wallonne
 10th Overall Tour de France
1985
 1st  Overall Tour de Suisse
1st  Points classification
1st  Mountains classification
1st Stages 3, 5b & 8
 1st  Overall Critérium du Dauphiné Libéré
1st Stage 1b
 1st  Overall Tour Mediterranean
1st Stage 4b
 1st Rund um den Henninger Turm Frankfurt
 1st E3 Prijs Vlaanderen
 2nd Overall Tour of Belgium
1st Stages 2 & 3b
 2nd Overall Setmana Catalana de Ciclisme
1st Stages 2 & 3
 2nd Tour of Flanders
 2nd Gent–Wevelgem
 2nd Super Prestige Pernod International
 4th Overall Paris–Nice
1st Stage 4b (TTT)
 5th Overall Tour de France
 5th Amstel Gold Race
 7th Liège–Bastogne–Liège
1986
 1st Paris–Tours
 1st Stage 3b Nissan Classic
 3rd Overall Coors Classic
1st Stage 3
 3rd Giro di Lombardia
1987
 1st Milano–Torino
 6th Amstel Gold Race
 7th Overall Giro d'Italia
 9th Rund um den Henninger Turm Frankfurt
 10th Gent–Wevelgem
1988
 1st  Overall Danmark Rundt
1st Stage 3
 Nissan Classic
1st Stage 2 & 4
 1st Stage 3 Tirreno–Adriatico
 2nd Tour of Flanders
 2nd Milano–Torino
1989
 1st  Overall Tour de Romandie
1st Stage 1
 1st Stage 17 Giro d'Italia
 1st Stage 2 Kellogg's Tour
 1st Stage 5b Nissan Classic
 3rd Liège–Bastogne–Liège
1990
 Giro d'Italia
1st  Intergiro classification
1st Stage 4b
 1st Stage 5 Tour de Luxembourg
 2nd Paris–Tours
 4th Overall Three Days of De Panne
 10th Amstel Gold Race
1991
 1st  Overall Kellogg's Tour
1st  Mountains classification
1st Stages 1 & 3
 1st  Overall Tour Mediterranean
1st Stages 5 & 6
 1st  Overall Settimana Internazionale di Coppi e Bartali
1st Stage 6
 1st Stage 10 Tour de France
 1st Stage 8 Tour de Suisse
 1st Stage 4 Tour DuPont
 2nd E3 Prijs Vlaanderen
 7th Milan–San Remo
 7th Züri-Metzgete
 10th UCI Road World Cup
1992
 1st  Overall Nissan Classic
1st Stage 4
 Tour DuPont
1st Stages 5, 8 & 9
 1st Grand Prix d'Isbergues
 3rd Overall Settimana Internazionale di Coppi e Bartali
 3rd Paris–Brussels
 6th Paris–Tours
1993
 1st  Overall Kellogg's Tour
1st Stage 1
 1st  Overall Tour of Sweden
1st Stage 4
 1st GP Impanis
1994
 1st  Team time trial, Commonwealth Games

General classification results timeline

See also
List of Australians who have led the Tour de France general classification

References

External links 

 
 
 
 

1958 births
Living people
People educated at Trinity Grammar School, Kew
Cyclists from Melbourne
Australian male cyclists
Australian Tour de France stage winners
Cyclists at the 1978 Commonwealth Games
Recipients of the Medal of the Order of Australia
Recipients of the Australian Sports Medal
Recipients of the Centenary Medal
Sport Australia Hall of Fame inductees
Australian Giro d'Italia stage winners
Danmark Rundt winners
Tour de Suisse stage winners
Commonwealth Games gold medallists for Australia
Commonwealth Games medallists in cycling
Medallists at the 1978 Commonwealth Games